Gillmeria miantodactylus is a moth of the family Pterophoridae. It is found in France, Austria, Hungary, Romania, Bulgaria, North Macedonia, Ukraine, Russia and Asia Minor.

The larvae possibly feed on Scabiosa ochroleuca.

References

Moths described in 1841
Platyptiliini
Moths of Asia
Moths of Europe